Baar is a German surname. Notable people with the surname include:

 Arthur Baar, Austrian head of SC Hakoah Wien
 Hein de Baar (born 1949), Dutch oceanographer
 Jindřich Šimon Baar (1869–1925), Czech writer, clergy
 Roland Baar (born 1965), German sportsman
 T. Baar, managing director of the Continental Wondergraph Company, a cinema chain established in Australia in 1910
 Tim Baar (1912–1977), American special effects artist

German-language surnames